The Miꞌkmaq are a First Nations people living in parts of Canada's Atlantic Provinces, Quebec, and New England.

Miꞌkmaq may also refer to:
The Miꞌkmaq language, an Eastern Algonquian language
Miꞌkmaq hieroglyphic writing, a memory aid used by the Miꞌkmaq

See also
Micmac (disambiguation)